Charles Anderson-Pelham, 1st Baron Yarborough FRS FSA (3 February 1749 – 22 September 1823) was a British politician.

Early life
Anderson-Pelham was born Charles Anderson in Broughton, Lincolnshire, the eldest son and heir of Francis Anderson and his wife Eleanor (née Carter) Anderson. His father died in 1758 and in 1763, he succeeded to the estates of his great-uncle Charles Pelham and assumed the additional surname of Pelham. In 1768 his mother remarried to Robert Vyner of Gautby, Lincolnshire, who was an MP. From his mother's second marriage, he had a younger half-brother, Robert Vyner.

His paternal grandparents were Francis Anderson, of Manby and Mary ( Pelham) Anderson. His maternal grandfather was Thomas Carter of Basavern, Denbigh and his uncle was the Rev. Robert Carter–Thelwall (whose daughter, Charlotte Thelwall, was the first wife of William Beauclerk, 8th Duke of St Albans).

Anderson entered Eton with his younger brother, Francis Evelyn Anderson, in 1763, the same year he assumed the surname Pelham. In 1789, he served as steward of the Eton anniversary.

Career
Anderson-Pelham was elected to the House of Commons for Beverley in 1768, a seat he held until 1774, and then represented Lincolnshire until 1794. The latter year he was raised to the peerage as Baron Yarborough, of Yarborough in the County of Lincoln. After being elevated to the House of Lords, his seat in the House of Commons was taken by his younger half-brother, Robert Vyner.

He was appointed High Sheriff of Lincolnshire for 1771.  The same year, he commissioned a marble statue of Mars from John Bacon, which he exhibited in his residence.

He was elected a Fellow of the Royal Society in 1777 and a Fellow of the Society of Antiquaries in 1796.

Personal life
On 21 July 1770, Charles was married to Sophie Aufrere, daughter and heir of George Aufrere of Chelsea. Before her death on 25 January 1786, they were the parents of:

 Hon. Arabella Anderson-Pelham (d. 1871), who married Thomas Fieschi Heneage, son of George Fieschi Heneage and Hon. Katherine Petre (a daughter of Robert Petre, 8th Baron Petre), in 1802.
 Hon. Georgiana Anne Anderson-Pelham (d. 1861), who married Francis John Bateman Dashwood, of Well Vale, in 1811; his sister Harriet was the wife of James Harris, 2nd Earl of Malmesbury.
 Hon. Sophia Anderson-Pelham (1775–1856), who married Dudley Long North of Glemham Hall in 1802.
 Hon. Maria Charlotte Anderson-Pelham (d. 1840), who married William Tennant of Ashton Hall, son of William Tennant, in 1804.
 Hon. Caroline Anderson-Pelham (1777–1812), who married Robert Cary Elwes, of Great Billing, in 1797.
 Charles Anderson-Pelham, 1st Earl of Yarborough (1781–1846), who married Henrietta Simpson, daughter of the Hon. John Bridgeman Simpson, in 1806.
 Hon. George Anderson-Pelham (1785–1835), who died unmarried.

Lord Yarborough died in Brocklesby, Lincolnshire, on 22 September 1823, aged 74. He was succeeded in the barony by his son Charles, who was created Earl of Yarborough in 1837.

Descendants
Through his daughter Arabella, he was a grandfather of Charles Fieschi Heneage (1806–1885), who married Louisa Elizabeth Graves (a daughter of Thomas Graves, 2nd Baron Graves), and parents of Admiral Sir Algernon Charles Fieschi Heneage.

Through his daughter Maria, he was a grandfather of Charlotte Anne Josephine Tennant, who married Sir Richard Rycroft, 3rd Baronet.

Ancestry

References

External links 

Anderson-Pelham family tree

 

1749 births
1823 deaths
People from Lincolnshire
Members of the Parliament of Great Britain for English constituencies
British MPs 1768–1774
British MPs 1774–1780
British MPs 1780–1784
British MPs 1784–1790
British MPs 1790–1796
Barons Yarborough
Peers of Great Britain created by George III
Fellows of the Royal Society
High Sheriffs of Lincolnshire